InterTV Serra+Mar is a television station licensed to Nova Friburgo, Rio de Janeiro, Brazil affiliated with TV Globo. The station is owned by Rede InterTV.

History 
The TV Serra+Mar went on air on May 1, 1990. The first week on the air debuted the RJTV place, with the presentation of Ana Lucia Morais. Programs were produced as the magazine SM TV and SM Rural. Another product of the station was the site ISerramar.com, disabled in 2004. Between 1996 and 2004, the TV Serra+Mar was the relay in the northwest of Rio de Janeiro, with a branch in Itaperuna.

In 2004, station is renamed InterTV Serra+Mar, retransmitting local programming of Rede InterTV, formed in the State of Rio also by InterTV Alto Litoral and InterTV Planície. In January 2005, the local TV Serra+Mar news are no longer anchored in Nova Friburgo and are centralized in São Pedro da Aldeia, the former headquarters of InterTV Alto Litoral. Currently, the signal comes in some neighborhoods of Rio de Janeiro, through its relay in Petropolis, on UHF channel 14.

In 2007, the InterTV Serra+Mar leaves his headquarters where he ran for 17 years at the top of the neighborhood Cascatinha toward central Nova Friburgo. The current headquarters of the InterTV Serra+Mar is located in the neighborhood Parque São Clemente. In Petropolis, the branch located at Rua Marechal Deodoro Center. The station has had branches in Teresopolis and Itaperuna.

Coverage From InterTV Serra+Mar 
The InterTV Serra+Mar covers 15 municipalities in the região serrana, 3 Of Noroeste and 1 of the Baixada Litorênea, which are:
Aperibé
Areal
Bom Jardim - Channels 4 and 8
Cachoeiras de Macacu
Cantagalo - Channel 5
Carmo - Channel 26
Cordeiro - Channel 4
Duas Barras - Channel 4
Itaocara - Channel 46
Macuco
Nova Friburgo - Channel 12
Petrópolis - Channel 14
Santa Maria Madalena - Channel 13
Santo Antônio de Pádua - Channel 11
São José do Vale do Rio Preto - Channel 16
São Sebastião do Alto
Sumidouro - Channel 8
Teresópolis - Channel 26
Trajano de Morais - Channel 9

Programming 
Bom Dia Rio, transmitted by Globo Rio.
Bom Dia Rio (bloco local), made by Cristina Frazão, generated in Cabo Frio by InterTV Alto Litoral.
InterTV Notícia, made by Ana Paula Mendes e Antônio Coelho, generated in Cabo Frio by InterTV Alto Litoral.
RJ InterTV, first edition made by Ana Paula Mendes, generated in Cabo Frio by InterTV Alto Litoral. Second edition made by Luciana Thomaz, single program produced in Nova Friburgo.
InterTV Rural, made by Ivan Lemos, generated in Cabo Frio by InterTV Alto Litoral.

Reporters 
Maria Valente (Petrópolis)
Karen de Souza (Petrópolis)
Leandro Oliveira (Nova Friburgo)
Bruna Verly (Nova Friburgo)
Guilherme Peixoto (Nova Friburgo)
Marcela Lima (Nova Friburgo)

Television networks in Brazil
TV Globo affiliates